John Gill may refer to:

Sports
John Gill (cricketer) (1854–1888), New Zealand cricketer
John Gill (coach) (1898–1997), American football coach
John Gill (footballer, born 1903), English professional footballer
John Gill (American football) (born 1986), American football defensive tackle
John Gill (footballer, born 1941), Australian rules footballer for Carlton
John Gill (footballer, born 1932) (1932–2003), Australian rules footballer for Essendon
John Gill (climber) (born 1937), American mathematician famed for his rock-climbing, especially bouldering

Politics
John Gill (Australian politician) (1823–1889), New South Wales colonial politician
John Gill Jr. (1850–1918), U.S. Representative from Maryland
John Gill (trade unionist) (1898–1971), Irish trade unionist and Labour TD

Religion
John Gill (theologian) (1697–1771), English Baptist minister and Calvinist theologian
John Glanville Gill (1909–1979), Unitarian minister, scholar, and civil rights activist

Other
John Gill (printer) (1732–1785), American printer and co-owner of the Boston Gazette
John Elkington Gill (1821–1874), 19th-century architect
John Gill (judge) (died 1899), Manx Deemster

See also
Johnny Gill (disambiguation)
John Gill Shorter (1818–1872), Democratic governor of Alabama